Serge Giacchini (17 January 1932 – 11 March 2021) was a French bobsledder. He competed in the two-man event at the 1956 Winter Olympics.

References

External links
 

1932 births
2021 deaths
French male bobsledders
Olympic bobsledders of France
Bobsledders at the 1956 Winter Olympics
Place of birth missing